La Vaguada is a shopping mall located in Madrid, Spain.

Interior shops
There are a variety of shops in La Vaguada.
El Corte Inglés, Spain's only department store,
Alcampo, inside Alcampo is an EB Games section,
Victoria's Secret,
The Phone House,
Taco Bell,
Kentucky Fried Chicken,
Vips,
GAME,
McDonald's.

Translation
The name of this mall means thalweg. La Vaguada is a proper name not a common one. However, this mall was built in a former thalweg.

Westfield Group
Shopping malls in Spain
Buildings and structures in Fuencarral-El Pardo District, Madrid